Rosaline Elbay is an Egyptian stage and screen actress, producer and writer. She is known for her roles as 'Judy Goodwin' on Netflix series Kaleidoscope, 'Amani' on Hulu/A24 Films series Ramy, and 'Sara' on MBC Masr series Qabeel.

Early life 
Elbay was born and raised in Cairo to Egyptian parents. She grew up speaking English, Arabic and French, jokingly describing her English accent, which has led to an assumption that she is British-born, as a 'product of colonialism'. She read Classics and Archaeology at Oxford University and completed a master's in Colonial History.

Elbay then studied at the Actors Studio New York City with Elizabeth Kemp before moving on to her two-year MFA in Acting at LAMDA. Her early career was in UK theater.

Career 
In 2018 Elbay starred in Diamond Dust, the feature-film adaptation of Ahmed Mourad's bestselling novel, and Fork & Knife, which premiered at the 2018 El Gouna Film Festival. She was also the subject of the music video for "Fakra" by Massar Egbari, an Egyptian band that rose to prominence during the 2011 Egyptian Revolution, as the love interest of lead singer Hany Dakkak.

Since 2019, Elbay has starred as Amani in Hulu/A24 Films series Ramy, Ramy Youssef's eponymous Golden Globe and Peabody Award-winning show. Season 2, co-starring Mahershala Ali, premiered in May 2020.

Also in 2019, Elbay received critical acclaim for her MENA region television debut as Sara, the partner of protagonist Tarek (Mohamed Mamdouh), on MBC Masr's Qabeel, and won the Al-Wafd Critics’ Choice Awards for Best Supporting Actress and Best New Face.

Elbay hosted the opening ceremony of the 2019 El Gouna Film Festival, during which she wore a dress made of recycled plastic that was hand-worked by refugee women sponsored by the UNHCR. She has since continued advocating for the organisation, participating in the first MENA-region round table on The Role of Art and Culture in Addressing Displacement.

Elbay is also described in MENA publications as an advocate for women's rights, and contributed to the cancellation of a 2020 concert by Moroccan singer Saad Lamjarred, who has been the subject of several rape accusations. In 2020, Mada Masr published a personal op-ed by Elbay in response to the Egyptian MeToo movement.

The Cairo International Film Festival appointed Elbay as its face for young filmmakers during its 40th and 41st Editions. Her screenplay, "Garlic", was developed at the Festival's TV Development Workshop.

Elbay was starring in MBC Masr’s 2020 series Forgetfulness (Luebet Al Nesyan), directed by Hani Khalifa. However, she left the show mid-filming for health reasons and the rest of her role was shot with Asmaa Galal.

In September 2021, Elbay was announced as a principle cast member of the Netflix series Kaleidoscope alongside Giancarlo Esposito, Paz Vega, Rufus Sewell, Tati Gabrielle, Peter Mark Kendall and Jai Courtney. Her character Judy Goodwin is described as “the crew’s demolitions specialist, headstrong and independent — an eccentric spitfire with a sarcastic edge who is clever and talented enough to stay a step ahead of her mistakes.” The series shot in New York and debuted on January 1st 2023, claiming the number one spot on Netflix's most-watched list.

In October 2021, Elbay revealed that she is starring in an animated role and executive producing an unnamed project, both not yet announced.

In October 2022, Elbay starred off-Broadway in the world premiere of Dodi & Diana opposite her Kaleidoscope co-star Peter Mark Kendall.

Personal Life 
During the COVID-19 pandemic, Elbay announced her departure from a lead role in MBC Masr series Forgetfulness (Luebet Al Nesyan) following her doctors' advice regarding a preexisting heart condition.

In an op-ed in Mada Masr, Elbay stated that she had experienced domestic violence in a previous relationship. 

She lives in New York. She is also a painter.

Awards and nominations 
Elbay was awarded the 2019 Al-Wafd Critics' Choice Awards for Best Supporting Actress and Best New Face for her role in Qabeel.

Filmography

Film

Television

Theatre

References

External links 

Official Website 
 

Living people
1990 births
Actresses from London
Actresses from Cairo
Alumni of the London Academy of Music and Dramatic Art
Actors Studio alumni
21st-century British actresses
21st-century Egyptian actresses
British film actresses
Egyptian film actresses
Egyptian television actresses
British television actresses
Alumni of Oriel College, Oxford
21st-century English women
21st-century English people